Moscow University Ice Shelf is a narrow ice shelf, about  long, which fringes the Sabrina Coast of Antarctica between Totten Glacier and Paulding Bay. Dalton Iceberg Tongue extends north from the eastern part of the shelf. The feature was partly delineated from aerial photographs taken by U.S. Navy Operation Highjump in 1946–47, and further photographed and mapped by the Australian National Antarctic Research Expeditions and the Soviet Antarctic Expedition in 1958. It was named by the Soviet expedition after Moscow University.

See also
 List of glaciers
 List of Antarctic ice shelves

References

Ice shelves of Antarctica
Bodies of ice of Wilkes Land